Claremont Airport may refer to a location:

 Claremont Airport (Maryland), United States, also known as Cecil County Airport
 Claremont Municipal Airport, New Hampshire, United States
 Claremont Airbase, aerial firefighting base near Brukunga in South Australia, Australia

See also 
 Claremont (disambiguation)